Haloguignardia is a genus of fungi in the family Lulworthiaceae. The genus was first described in 1956 by Alan and Joan Cribb.

References

External links

Sordariomycetes genera
Lulworthiales